Zehr (also Romanized as Z̧ahr and Z̧ehr; also known as Kalāteh-ye Z̧ahr and Kalāteh-ye Z̧ehr) is a village in Borun Rural District, in the Eslamiyeh District of Ferdows County, South Khorasan Province, Iran. At the 2006 census, its population was 57, in 27 families.

References 

Populated places in Ferdows County